In optics, polarized light can be described using the Jones calculus, discovered by R. C. Jones in 1941. Polarized light is represented by a Jones vector, and linear optical elements are represented by Jones matrices. When light crosses an optical element the resulting polarization of the emerging light is found by taking the product of the Jones matrix of the optical element and the Jones vector of the incident light.
Note that Jones calculus is only applicable to light that is already fully polarized. Light which is randomly polarized, partially polarized, or incoherent must be treated using Mueller calculus.

Jones vector 
The Jones vector describes the polarization of light in free space or another homogeneous isotropic non-attenuating medium, where the light can be properly described as transverse waves. Suppose that a monochromatic plane wave of light is travelling in the positive z-direction, with angular frequency ω and wave vector k = (0,0,k), where the wavenumber k = ω/c. Then the electric and magnetic fields E and H are orthogonal to k at each point; they both lie in the plane "transverse" to the direction of motion. Furthermore, H is determined from E by 90-degree rotation and a fixed multiplier depending on the wave impedance of the medium. So the polarization of the light can be determined by studying E. The complex amplitude of E is written 

Note that the physical E field is the real part of this vector; the complex multiplier serves up the phase information.

The Jones vector is

Thus, the Jones vector represents the amplitude and phase of the electric field in the x and y  directions.

The sum of the squares of the absolute values of the two components of Jones vectors is proportional to the intensity of light.  It is common to normalize it to 1 at the starting point of calculation for simplification.  It is also common to constrain the first component of the Jones vectors to be a real number. This discards the overall phase information that would be needed for calculation of interference with other beams.

Circular polarization described under Jones' convention is called : "From the point of view of the receiver." Collett uses the opposite definition for the phase. Circular polarization described under Collett's convention is called : "From the point of view of the source." The reader should be wary of the choice of convention when consulting references on the Jones calculus.

The following table gives the 6 common examples of normalized Jones vectors.

A general vector that points to any place on the surface is written as a ket . When employing the Poincaré sphere (also known as the Bloch sphere), the basis kets ( and ) must be assigned to opposing (antipodal) pairs of the kets listed above.  For example, one might assign  =  and  = .  These assignments are arbitrary.  Opposing pairs are

  and 
  and 
  and 

Jones matrices 
The Jones matrices are operators that act on the Jones vectors defined above.  These matrices are implemented by various optical elements such as lenses, beam splitters, mirrors, etc.  Each matrix represents projection onto a one-dimensional complex subspace of the Jones vectors. The following table gives examples of Jones matrices for polarizers:

Phase retarders 
A phase retarder is an optical element that produces a phase difference between two orthogonal polarization components of a monochromatic polarized beam of light.  Mathematically, using kets to represent Jones vectors, this means that the action of a phase retarder is to transform light with polarization 
 
to 
 
where  are orthogonal polarization components (i.e. ) that are determined by the physical nature of the phase retarder.  In general, the orthogonal components could be any two basis vectors.  For example, the action of the circular phase retarder is such that

In fact, sometimes the term "phase retarder" is used to refer specifically to linear phase retarders.

Linear phase retarders are usually made out of birefringent uniaxial crystals such as calcite, MgF2 or quartz.  Plates made of these materials for this purpose are referred to as waveplates. Uniaxial crystals have one crystal axis that is different from the other two crystal axes (i.e., ni ≠ nj = nk). This unique axis is called the extraordinary axis and is also referred to as the optic axis. An optic axis can be the fast or the slow axis for the crystal depending on the crystal at hand. Light travels with a higher phase velocity along an axis that has the smallest refractive index and this axis is called the fast axis. Similarly, an axis which has the largest refractive index is called a slow axis since the phase velocity of light is the lowest along this axis. "Negative" uniaxial crystals (e.g., calcite CaCO3, sapphire Al2O3) have ne < no so for these crystals, the extraordinary axis (optic axis) is the fast axis, whereas for "positive" uniaxial crystals (e.g., quartz SiO2, magnesium fluoride MgF2, rutile TiO2), ne > no and thus the extraordinary axis (optic axis) is the slow axis.  Other commercially available linear phase retarders exist and are used in more specialized applications.  The Fresnel rhombs is one such alternative.

Any linear phase retarder with its fast axis defined as the x- or y-axis has zero off-diagonal terms and thus can be conveniently expressed as 

Then a positive  (i.e.  > ) means that  doesn't attain the same value as  until a later time, i.e.  leads . Similarly, if , then  leads .

For example, if the fast axis of a quarter waveplate is horizontal, then the phase velocity along the horizontal direction is ahead of the vertical direction i.e.,  leads . Thus,  which for a quarter waveplate yields .

Then   means that  doesn't attain the same value as  until a later time, i.e.  leads .

The Jones matrix for an arbitrary birefringent material is the most general form of a polarization transformation in the Jones calculus; it can represent any polarization transformation.  To see this, one can show

The above matrix is a general parametrization for the elements of SU(2), using the convention 

where the overline denotes complex conjugation.

Finally, recognizing that the set of unitary transformations on  can be expressed as

it becomes clear that the Jones matrix for an arbitrary birefringent material represents any unitary transformation, up to a phase factor . However, in the Jones calculus, such phase factors do not change the represented polarization of a Jones vector, so are either considered arbitrary or imposed ad hoc to conform to a set convention.

The special expressions for the phase retarders can be obtained by taking suitable parameter values in the general expression for a birefringent material. In the general expression:
The relative phase retardation induced between the fast axis and the slow axis is given by 
 is the orientation of the fast axis with respect to the x-axis.
 is the circularity.

Note that for linear retarders,  = 0 and for circular retarders,  = ± /2,  = /4. In general for elliptical retarders,  takes on values between - /2 and /2.

Axially rotated elements 
Assume an optical element has its optic axis  perpendicular to the surface vector for the plane of incidence and is rotated about this surface vector by angle θ/2 (i.e., the principal plane through which the optic axis passes, makes angle θ/2 with respect to the plane of polarization of the electric field of the incident TE wave). Recall that a half-wave plate rotates polarization as twice the angle between incident polarization and optic axis (principal plane). Therefore, the Jones matrix for the rotated polarization state, M(θ), is 

 where 
This agrees with the expression for a half-wave plate in the table above. These rotations are identical to beam unitary splitter transformation in optical physics given by

where the primed and unprimed coefficients represent beams incident from opposite sides of the beam splitter. The reflected and transmitted components acquire a phase θr and θt, respectively. The requirements for a valid representation of the element are 

and

Both of these representations are unitary matrices fitting these requirements; and as such, are both valid.

Arbitrarily rotated elements 

This would involve a three-dimensional rotation matrix.  See Russell A. Chipman and Garam Yun for work done on this.

See also
 Polarization
 Scattering parameters
 Stokes parameters
 Mueller calculus
 Photon polarization

Notes

References

Further reading

 E. Collett, Field Guide to Polarization, SPIE Field Guides vol. FG05, SPIE (2005). .
 D. Goldstein and E. Collett, Polarized Light, 2nd ed., CRC Press (2003). .
 E. Hecht, Optics, 2nd ed., Addison-Wesley (1987). .
 Frank L. Pedrotti, S.J. Leno S. Pedrotti, Introduction to Optics, 2nd ed., Prentice Hall (1993). 
 A. Gerald and J.M. Burch, Introduction to Matrix Methods in Optics,1st ed., John Wiley & Sons(1975). 
 
 
 
 
 
 
 
 
 
 
 
 
 
 William Shurcliff (1966) Polarized Light: Production and Use, chapter 8 Mueller Calculus and Jones Calculus, page 109, Harvard University Press.

External links
 Jones Calculus written by E. Collett on Optipedia

Optics
Polarization (waves)
Matrices